The Carl Barks Library (CBL) is a series of 30 large hardcover books reprinting all of the Disney comics stories and covers written and/or drawn by Carl Barks. Stories that were modified in the original publication, sometimes for production reasons and sometimes due to excessive editing, were restored in CBL to Barks' original intent. The books are collected in ten slipcase volumes with three books in each, a total of about 7,400 pages. The volumes were published from 1983 to 1990 in the United States by Another Rainbow Publishing under license from The Walt Disney Company. The comics were printed (with a few exceptions) in black and white. In addition to the comics, there are numerous articles with background information.

Volume sets

Reprintings
Gladstone Publishing (a subsidiary of Another Rainbow) published a full-color version, The Carl Barks Library in Color, in a series of 141 comic book albums between 1992 and 1998.

Fantagraphics Books is currently collecting all of Barks' work as a hardcover collection, The Complete Carl Barks Disney Library.

See also
The Carl Barks Collection
List of Disney comics by Carl Barks

References

External links

30 Volume Carl Barks Library – by Another Rainbow
https://nafsk.se/dcml/cbl.html
http://www.seriesam.com/barks/deta_text_s_cblh.html

Donald Duck
Comic book collection books
Eisner Award winners
Disney comics titles
Another Rainbow titles
Comics by Carl Barks